Bradshaw Peak is a peak rising to ,  south east of Turk Peak, Churchill Mountains. It is situated on the south west side of McLay Glacier. The peak was named in honor of Margaret Bradshaw, geological scientist, University of Canterbury. Margaret is an eminent geologist and in 1979 was the first woman to lead a deep field party in the Antarctic. Margaret is also the only New Zealand woman to be awarded the Polar Medal.

References
 

Mountains of Oates Land